Roxy (alternatively Roxie) is a given name.

Notable people with the name include:

People
 Roxxie, American lesbian cartoonist
 Roxy Beaudro (1884–1960), Canadian ice hockey player
 Roxy Bernstein (born 1972), American sportscaster 
 Roxey Ann Caplin (1793–1888), British writer and inventor
 Roxie Dean (born 1974), American country music songwriter and singer
 Roxy Dorlas (born 1987), Dutch–Filipino footballer
 Roxie Lawson (1906–1977), American Major League Baseball pitcher and minor league manager
 Roxie Collie Laybourne (1910–2003), American ornithologist
 Roxy Paine (born 1966), American artist
 Roxie Roker (1929–1995), American actress
 Michael Roxy Roxborough (born 1951), American odds maker, syndicated columnist, teacher and author
 Samuel Roxy Rothafel (1882–1936), New York City movie theater pioneer
 Roxy Shahidi (born 1983), English actress

Fictional characters
 Roxy, the Fairy of Animals and last terrestrial fairy of Earth, a character in the animated series Winx Club  and the cancelled alternate spinoff World of Winx
 Roxy Astor, a female professional wrestler from the Gorgeous Ladies of Wrestling
 Roxy Balsom, in the soap opera One Life to Live
 Roxy Carmichael, in the film Welcome Home, Roxy Carmichael
 Roxy Harmon, in the film God Bless America
 Roxie Hart, in the play Chicago and its adaptations
 Roxy Harvey, in the TV series Dead Like Me
 Roxy Hunter, in four films (2007-2008)
 Roxy LeBlanc, in the TV series Army Wives
 Roxy Leech, a DC Comics character
 Roxie Marie, in the children's TV series Sesame Street
 Roxy Migurdia, in the Light novel series Mushoku Tensei 
 Roxy Miller, in the soap opera Home and Away
 Roxy Miller, in the film Eegah
 Roxy Mitchell, in the soap opera EastEnders
 Roxy Rocket, a DC Comics villain
 Roxy (Hannah Montana), in the TV series Hannah Montana
 Roxie (Pokémon), in the Pokémon universe
 Roxy Lalonde, in the webcomic Homestuck
 Roxanne "Roxy" Washington, a Marvel character known as Bling!
 Roxie Mcterrier, a character from Littlest Pet Shop: A World of Our Own
 Roxie, a camp counselor from the TV series Camp Cretaceous

See also
 Roxanne (disambiguation)

Lists of people by nickname